Green Township may refer to:

Indiana
 Green Township, Grant County, Indiana
 Green Township, Hancock County, Indiana
 Green Township, Madison County, Indiana
 Green Township, Marshall County, Indiana
 Green Township, Morgan County, Indiana
 Green Township, Noble County, Indiana
 Green Township, Randolph County, Indiana
 Green Township, Wayne County, Indiana

Iowa
 Green Township, Fremont County, Iowa
 Green Township, Wapello County, Iowa

Kansas
 Green Township, Pottawatomie County, Kansas, in Pottawatomie County, Kansas

Michigan
 Green Township, Alpena County, Michigan
 Green Charter Township, Michigan, in Mecosta County

Missouri
 Green Township, Hickory County, Missouri
 Green Township, Lawrence County, Missouri
 Green Township, Livingston County, Missouri
 Green Township, Nodaway County, Missouri
 Green Township, Platte County, Missouri

Nebraska
 Green Township, Saunders County, Nebraska

New Jersey
 Green Township, New Jersey

North Dakota
 Green Township, Barnes County, North Dakota

Ohio
 Green Township, Adams County, Ohio
 Green Township, Ashland County, Ohio
 Green Township, Brown County, Ohio
 Green Township, Clark County, Ohio
 Green Township, Clinton County, Ohio
 Green Township, Fayette County, Ohio
 Green Township, Gallia County, Ohio
 Green Township, Hamilton County, Ohio
 Green Township, Harrison County, Ohio
 Green Township, Hocking County, Ohio
 Green Township, Mahoning County, Ohio
 Green Township, Monroe County, Ohio
 Green Township, Ross County, Ohio
 Green Township, Scioto County, Ohio
 Green Township, Shelby County, Ohio
 Green Township, Summit County, Ohio, now the city of Green
 Green Township, Wayne County, Ohio

Pennsylvania
 Green Township, Forest County, Pennsylvania
 Green Township, Indiana County, Pennsylvania

See also
 Greene Township (disambiguation)

Township name disambiguation pages